Cobitis zanandreai is a species of ray-finned fish in the family Cobitidae. It is found only in Central-Italy. It is threatened by habitat loss.

References

Sources 

Cobitis
Endemic fauna of Italy
Fish described in 1965
Taxonomy articles created by Polbot